Christopher Hale is a British non-fiction writer and documentary producer who has produced documentaries for most of the major international broadcasters. From 2013 to 2017, he was the executive producer of the Channel News Asia International unit in Singapore. Hale and a small team of producers made a number of series including ‘Power and Piety’, five documentaries about religious conflict; ‘The Asian Century’ focusing on pivotal moments in Asian history; and ‘Inventing Southeast Asia’ made with Dr Farish Noor. CNAi won a number of regional awards.

Education and career
Hale was educated at the University of Sussex and Slade School of Fine Art - and began his television career as a film editor. He made some apprentice films at the BBC, including a One Pair of Eyes episode called Nationality Uncertain - and was offered the opportunity to make a major documentary for Channel 4 called Is there Anybody There, with the psychologist Nicholas Humphrey. He has since made series and many one-off programmes, including Search for the Sons of Abraham].

In 1989, Hale's Byline: Blind to Science (BBC) won a Special Award from the British Association for the Advancement of Science (BAAS).

In 1999, Hale made Atlantis Reborn for the BBC science strand Horizon, a critique of pseudo historical ideas focusing on the myth of Atlantis and the claims of writer Graham Hancock. When the documentary was transmitted, Hancock complained to the Broadcasting Standards Commission - now Ofcom - which exonerated the broadcaster of any significant unfairness. Hale described the experience of making the film and dealing with the anger it provoked in a chapter The Atleantean Box in 'Archaeological Fantasies', edited by Garret G. Fagan for Routledge.

In 2002, Hale was commissioned by Bantam Books to write a book about the Heinrich Himmler-sponsored 1938–1939 German expedition to Tibet. Research in archives in the UK and Germany, as well as research visits to India and Tibet led to Himmler's Crusade. Hale has featured in a Secret History for Channel 4 and ZDF.

Himmler's Crusade has been translated into Romanian, Polish, Greek and other languages. In 2006, the Italian translation of the book won the Giuseppe Mazotti prize.

Hale published Hitler's Foreign Executioners – an intensive analysis of SS recruitment of non German police and Waffen-SS units and their role in the Nazi genocide. This is also available in Italian, Czech, Polish and Estonian versions.

Hale's third non-fiction book was a revisionist analysis of the Malayan Emergency: Massacre in Malaya: Exposing Britain's My Lai (2013)

He contributed to The Waffen SS (OUP, 2016).

Hale's most recent non-fiction book is Deception: how the Nazis Tricked the Last Jews of Europe, published in September 2019.

Bibliography
Hale, Christopher. Himmler's Crusade : the true story of the 1938 Nazi expedition into Tibet / Christopher Hale. London : Bantam, 2003. xiv, 422 p., [32] p. of plates : ill. (some col.), maps, ports. ; 24 cm. Includes bibliographical references and index. 
 Hale, Christopher. Himmler’s crusade : the Nazi expedition to find the origins of the Aryan race / Christopher Hale. Hoboken, N.J. : J. Wiley, c2003. x, 422 p., [26] p. of plates : ill., maps ; 24 cm. 
 
 Hale, Christopher. Massacre in Malaya: Exposing Britain's My Lai (History Press, 2012) 
 Hale, Christopher. 'Deception: how the Nazis Tricked the Last Jews of Europe' (History Press, 2019)

See also 
 1938–1939 German expedition to Tibet

References 

Review of Himmler's Crusade in The Daily Telegraph:  The master race in the mountains
John J. Reilly: Review of Himmler’s Crusade
Channel 4: The Nazi Expedition Mentions Himmler's Crusade as "The book on which the Channel 4 documentary was based."
Canada Tibet Committee: Review of Himmler's Crusade by Michael Burleigh in the Sunday Times, 3 August 3, 2003
Charles F. Urbanowicz / August 21, 2006. Fall 2006 Anthropology 496 Guidebook and Selected Anthropology Essays. Quotes Himmler's Crusade

External links 

Atlantis Reborn documentary on the BBC web site
Is there Anybody There

Living people
Year of birth missing (living people)
British writers
British television directors
Place of birth missing (living people)